The Pacific four-eyed fish (Anableps dowei) is a species of four-eyed fish native to the coastal waters on the Pacific side of southern Mexico to Nicaragua. This fish is gregarious and inhabits mangrove swamps, tidal mudflats, and other coastal brackish ecosystems. During low tide, they will crawl onto shore to eat algae and other organic matter. This species has female biased sexual dimorphism, with males growing to 22 cm (8.7 in) TL while females can grow up to 34 cm (13.4 in) TL. The male also has a prominent gonopodium used to impregnate females during mating. As with other members of Anablepinae, this species is livebearing and has left or right leaning genitals to prevent inbreeding.

The name "four-eyed fish" comes from how the eyes of the fish are split into two lobes horizontally, each with its own pupil and vision. This allows the fish to see above and below the water at the same time.

References 

Anablepidae
Viviparous fish
Fish of Central America
Freshwater fish of Central America
Cyprinodontiformes
Fish described in 1861